Berestivka is a village in Ukraine. It is located in Zviahel Raion of Zhytomyr Oblast. Its location code is KOATUUI: 1820680401. Its population is 460 people as of 2001. Its postal index is 260570. Its calling code is 4144

Village council 
The village council is located at 12734, Ukraine, Zhytomyr Oblast, Baranivskiy district, village Berestivka

External links
 Berestivka on website High Rada of Ukraine 

Villages in Zviahel Raion